
Year 793 (DCCXCIII) was a common year starting on Tuesday (link will display the full calendar) of the Julian calendar. The denomination 793 for this year has been used since the early medieval period, when the Anno Domini calendar era became the prevalent method in Europe for naming years.

Events 
 By place 

 Europe 
 King Charlemagne orders a 3 kilometre long channel dug from Treuchtlingen to Weißenburg (the Rhine and Danube river basins), to improve the transportation of goods between the Rhineland and Bavaria. Charlemagne's son, Pepin of Italy, campaigns against the Lombards in Benevento (Southern Italy).
 Frisian–Frankish War: Count Theoderic is sent to Frisia, to muster troops for another offensive against the Avar Khaganate. He is attacked and probably killed by Saxon rebels, near the mouth of the Weser River. The Frisians revolt, and Charlemagne deports Saxon families from north of the river Elbe.

 Britain 
 June 8 – Viking raiders attack the Northumbrian coast, arriving in longships from either Denmark or Norway, and sacking the monastery of Lindisfarne. Many of the monks are killed or enslaved. It is the first Viking attack on a monastery in the British Isles, although it is not the first known Viking attack in the British Isles. The first attack came in 789, when Vikings raided the settlement of Portland in Dorset.

 Arabian Empire 
 Emir Hisham I of Córdoba calls for a jihad ("Holy War") against the Christian Franks. He assembles an army of 70,000 men, half of which attacks the Kingdom of Asturias, destroying its capital, Oviedo, while the other half invades Languedoc, penetrating as far as Narbonne. After capturing the city, the contingent moved towards Carcassonne and conquered it too. Both armies return to Córdoba enriched with the spoils of war.

 By topic 

 Commerce 
 Arab traders make Baghdad a financial center of the Silk Road between China and Europe. Caravans carry little or no money on their long journeys; Chinese traders use what they call fei qian (zh) ("flying money") to avoid robbery. The Arabs have adopted a similar banking system known as hawala to transmit funds (approximate date).

 Religion 
 August 17 – Quriaqos of Tagrit is consecrated Syriac Orthodox Patriarch of Antioch at Harran.
 King Offa of Mercia founds an abbey at St Albans.

Births 
 Arnulf of Sens, Frankish nobleman (or 794)
 Li Ning, prince of the Tang Dynasty (d. 812)
 Theophylact, Byzantine co-emperor (approximate date)
 Wei Mo, chancellor of the Tang Dynasty (d. 858)
 Wu Yuanji, general of the Tang Dynasty (or 783)
 Zhou Chi, chancellor of the Tang Dynasty (d. 851)

Deaths 
 February 22 – Sicga, Anglo-Saxon nobleman
 Idriss I, Muslim emir and founder of the Idrisid Dynasty (or 791)

References